Victoria "Tori" Peña (born 30 July 1987) is a pole vaulter with dual American and Irish citizenship who competes for Ireland in IAAF competition.

Early life
Peña was born in Los Alamitos, California. Her father's family are of Mexican extraction, and her maternal grandmother Angela McCoy (née Coyle) was born in Derry. Peña lives in Huntington Beach, where she graduated from Edison High School. In 2003, she competed in Killarney at the World Irish Dancing Championships. She earned a degree in International Development Studies from the University of California, Los Angeles, and competed for the UCLA Bruins, although frequently hampered by injuries. Her Irish grandmother made her eligible for Irish citizenship, and in June 2010 she acquired dual citizenship, declared her intention to compete for Ireland, and registered with Finn Valley Athletic Club in County Donegal.

Irish career

References

External links
 
 Tori Pena profile on Instagram

1987 births
Living people
American people of Irish descent
American female pole vaulters
American sportspeople of Mexican descent
Athletes (track and field) at the 2012 Summer Olympics
Athletes (track and field) at the 2016 Summer Olympics
Naturalised citizens of Ireland
Olympic athletes of Ireland
Sportspeople from Huntington Beach, California
Sportspeople from County Donegal
Track and field athletes from California
UCLA Bruins women's track and field athletes
World Athletics Championships athletes for Ireland